The 2020–21 Buffalo Bulls men's basketball team represented the University at Buffalo in the 2020–21 NCAA Division I men's basketball season. The Bulls, led by second-year head coach Jim Whitesell, played their home games at Alumni Arena in Amherst, New York as members of the Mid-American Conference. Starting this season, the MAC announced the removal of divisions. They finished the season 16–9, 12–5 in MAC play to finish in second place. They defeated Miami (OH) and Akron to advance to the championship game of the MAC tournament where they lost to Ohio. They were invited to the National Invitation Tournament where they lost in the first round to Colorado State.

Previous season
The Bulls finished the 2019–20 season 20–12, 11–7 in MAC play to finish in third place in the MAC East division. They were upset in the first round of the MAC tournament by Miami (OH).

Roster

Schedule and results 

|-
!colspan=12 style=| Regular season

|-
!colspan=9 style=| MAC Tournament

|-

|-

|-
!colspan=9 style=| NIT

Source

References

Buffalo Bulls men's basketball seasons
Buffalo Bulls
Buffalo Bulls men's basketball
Buffalo Bulls men's basketball
Buffalo